The 2015 Canada Cup of Curling was held from December 3 to 7 at Revolution Place in Grande Prairie, Alberta. This was the first time that Grande Prairie hosted the Canada Cup, and the third time that Alberta hosted the Canada Cup, which was also held in Medicine Hat in 2010 and in Camrose in 2014.

Men

Teams
The teams are listed as follows: Due to a tie in CTRS points between the Reid Carruthers rink and the John Epping rink, both teams were invited to the event, expanding the field to eight teams.

Round-robin standings
Final round-robin standings

Round-robin results
All draw times listed are in Mountain Standard Time (UTC−7).

Draw 1
Wednesday, December 2, 8:30 am

Draw 2
Wednesday, December 2, 1:30 pm

Draw 3
Wednesday, December 2, 6:30 pm

Draw 4
Thursday, December 3, 8:30 am

Draw 5
Thursday, December 3, 1:30 pm

Draw 6
Thursday, December 3, 6:30 pm

Draw 7
Friday, December 4, 8:30 am

Draw 8
Friday, December 4, 1:30 pm

Draw 9
Friday, December 4, 6:30 pm

Draw 10
Saturday, December 5, 7:30 am

Tiebreaker
Saturday, December 5, 12:30 pm

Playoffs

Semifinal
Saturday, December 5, 6:30 pm

Final
Sunday, December 6, 5:00 pm

Women

Teams
The teams are listed as follows:

Round-robin standings
Final round-robin standings

Round-robin results
All draw times listed are in Mountain Standard Time (UTC−7).

Draw 1
Wednesday, December 2, 8:30 am

Draw 2
Wednesday, December 2, 1:30 pm

Draw 3
Wednesday, December 2, 6:30 pm

Draw 4
Thursday, December 3, 8:30 am

Draw 5
Thursday, December 3, 1:30 pm

Draw 6
Thursday, December 3, 6:30 pm

Draw 7
Friday, December 4, 8:30 am

Draw 8
Friday, December 4, 1:30 pm

Draw 9
Friday, December 4, 8:30 pm

Tiebreaker
Saturday, December 5, 11:30 am

Playoffs

Semifinal
Saturday, December 5, 1:30 pm

Final
Sunday, December 6, 11:00 am

References

External links

Canada Cup (curling)
Canada Cup
Canada Cup
Curling competitions in Alberta
Sport in Grande Prairie
December 2015 sports events in Canada